Synanthedon flavipalpis is a moth of the family Sesiidae. It is known from Malawi, South Africa and Zambia.

References

Sesiidae
Moths of Sub-Saharan Africa
Lepidoptera of Malawi
Moths described in 1910